Life Matters is a radio program that has been broadcast on Radio National by the Australian Broadcasting Corporation since 1992.  The first presenter was Geraldine Doogue, and  Hilary Harper and Michael MacKenzie present the program.

History
Life Matters was created as "a program charting social change" by Doogue, then Radio National general manager Norman Swan and producer Joanne Upham in 2002. Doogue had been recruited to the ABC in 1991 to present Offspring, a predecessor program to Life Matters.

Presenters
 Geraldine Doogue presented the program for eleven years from its inception.
 Julie McCrossin presented the program from 2002 to 2005. 
 Richard Aedy presented the program from 2006 to 2011.
 Natasha Mitchell presented the program from 2012 to 2016.
 Amanda Smith presented the program from 2017 to 2018.
 Hilary Harper and Michael Mackenzie have presented the program since 2019.

Format
From its inception the program has been broadcast on weekdays from 9 am.

References

External links

Australian Broadcasting Corporation radio programs
1992 radio programme debuts